John Bradley Harbord (1812 – 1896)  was a Church of England priest and author.

Harbord was born in Liverpool on 27 June 1828 and educated at St John's College, Cambridge. He was ordained in 1854 and after a curacy at Lower Halstow spent the remainder of his ecclesiastical career as a Naval chaplain, rising to be Chaplain of the Fleet from 1882 to 1888. He was an Honorary Chaplain to the Queen from 1889 until his death on 13 February 1896.

Works

Footnotes

Chaplains of the Fleet
19th-century English Anglican priests
Alumni of St John's College, Cambridge
Honorary Chaplains to the Queen
1812 births
1896 deaths
Clergy from Liverpool